Fernando Luis Gomes Guilherme (born January 6, 1988 in Fortaleza), is a Brazilian footballer, who currently plays for Mogi Mirim Esporte Clube.

Notes

External links
 websoccerclub

1988 births
Brazilian footballers
Living people
Sport Club Internacional players
Esporte Clube Vitória players
Mogi Mirim Esporte Clube players
Botafogo Futebol Clube (SP) players
América Futebol Clube (RN) players
Sportspeople from Fortaleza
Association football midfielders